This is a list of New Zealand disasters by death toll, listing major disasters (excluding acts of war) which occurred in New Zealand and its territories or involved a significant number of New Zealand citizens, in a specific incident, where the loss of life was 10 or more.

100 or more deaths

50 to 99 deaths

10 to 49 deaths

NOTE: The exact number of deaths in some early New Zealand shipwrecks is not fully recorded. There may be several shipwrecks not listed here which claimed ten or more lives.

Significant incidents resulting in fewer than 10 deaths

Pandemics and health crises

Significant incidents of New Zealanders being killed overseas

See also
 List of disasters in Antarctica by death toll
 List of disasters in Australia by death toll
 List of disasters in Canada by death toll
 List of disasters in Great Britain and Ireland by death toll
 List of earthquakes in New Zealand
 List of massacres in New Zealand
 List of natural disasters in New Zealand
 List of New Zealand-related topics
 List of rail accidents in New Zealand
 List of wars and anthropogenic disasters by death toll (worldwide)

References

External links
New Zealand disasters timeline, Ministry for Culture and Heritage
Natural hazards and disasters, Te Ara: The Encyclopedia of New Zealand
Shipwrecks, Te Ara: The Encyclopedia of New Zealand

 Death toll
New Zealand
History of New Zealand
Disaster